Cornelia Gilissen (September 21, 1915 – March 21, 1994) was an American diver who competed in the 1936 Summer Olympics. She was born in New York City. In 1936 she finished fifth in the 10 metre platform event.

References

1915 births
1994 deaths
American female divers
Olympic divers of the United States
Divers at the 1936 Summer Olympics
20th-century American women
20th-century American people